Rudel Obreja (6 August 1965 – 12 March 2023) was a Romanian boxer and businessman. He competed in the men's welterweight event at the 1984 Summer Olympics. Obreja also won four national senior titles, a bronze medal at the 1989 World Amateur Boxing Championships and a silver medal at the European Amateur Boxing Championships. He was the president of the Romanian Boxing Federation between 2004 and 2012. In 2007, he was elected vice president of AIBA, and was the chief technical officer for amateur boxing at the 2008 Summer Olympics in Beijing.

Obreja died on 12 March 2023, at age 57.

References

External links
 

1965 births
2023 deaths
Romanian male boxers
Olympic boxers of Romania
Boxers at the 1984 Summer Olympics
AIBA World Boxing Championships medalists
Welterweight boxers
Sportspeople from Galați